Ortoli is a surname. Notable people with the surname include:

François-Xavier Ortoli (1925–2007), French politician and 5th President of the European Commission 
Ortoli Commission, the European Commission that held office from 6 January 1973 to 5 January 1977
Jacques Ortoli (1895–1947), French flying ace and Corsican patriot
Julien d'Ortoli (born 1983), French sailor

See also